In mathematics, the coadjoint representation  of a Lie group  is the dual of the adjoint representation.

The importance of the coadjoint representation was emphasised by work of Alexandre Kirillov, who showed that for nilpotent Lie groups  a basic role in their representation theory is played by coadjoint orbits.

Formal definition
Let  be a Lie group and  be its Lie algebra. Then the coadjoint representation  is defined by
 for 
where  denotes the value of the linear functional  on the vector .

Let  denote the representation of the Lie algebra  on  induced by the coadjoint representation of the Lie group . Then the infinitesimal version of the defining equation for  reads:
 for 

where  is the adjoint representation of the Lie algebra .

Coadjoint orbit

.

The well-definedness, non-degeneracy, and -invariance of  follow from the following facts:

(ii) The kernel of the map  is exactly .

 is also closed. The canonical 2-form  is sometimes referred to as the Kirillov-Kostant-Souriau symplectic form or KKS form on the coadjoint orbit.

Properties of coadjoint orbits
The coadjoint action on a coadjoint orbit  is a Hamiltonian -action with momentum map given by the inclusion .

Examples

See also

Borel–Bott–Weil theorem, for  a compact group
Kirillov character formula
Kirillov orbit theory

References
Kirillov, A.A., Lectures on the Orbit Method, Graduate Studies in Mathematics, Vol. 64, American Mathematical Society,

External links
 

Representation theory of Lie groups
Symplectic geometry